Fina Torres (born Josefina Torres Benedetti; October 9, 1951) is a Venezuelan film director and screenwriter. She became internationally recognized by winning the la Caméra d'Or award at the 1985 Cannes Film Festival with her directorial debut film, Oriana.

She may be best-known for Oriana, Celestial Clockwork and Fox Searchlight Woman on Top with Penelope Cruz. She lives in Venezuela.

Background
Fina Torres was born in Caracas. She studied design, photography, and journalism. At the age of 17, she became a photojournalist. She enrolled at the Neumann institute for Design in 1970 as a graphics design student and also took social communication at Andrés Bello Catholic University.

In 1974, she moved to Paris where she earned a bachelor's degree in cinematography, direction and editing from the Institut des hautes études cinématographiques. She spent the next 28 years of her life in the film industry. After Paris, she lived in the United States, Mexico, Singapore, and eventually returned to Venezuela.

Career 
During her time in France, Torres worked as a photographer, camera operator, editor, and film script supervisor. In 1983, she co-wrote a script with Antoine Lacomblez, for which she secured production funds from both Venezuela's state funding agency, FONCINE (Fondo de Fomento Cinematográfico de Venezuela) and the Secretary of Foreign Affairs of France. The result was Torres' first film, Oriana, for which she won the Caméra d'Or award at the Cannes Film Festival. It was described by critic Vincent Camby in The New York Times as a "gothic romance".

In 1996, Torres' second film Celestial Clockwork, was released during the Toronto International Film Festival and [[Sundance Film Festival]. Roger Ebert's review, August 16, 1996: "Celestial Clockwork is a riotous carnival of music, colors, witchery, sexuality and magic. If Almodóvar had made this movie, it would have been hailed as his best work in years."

In 2000, Torres directed Woman on Top (Fox Searchlight production) with Penélope Cruz. The film made the official selection of the Cannes Film Festival in 1996.  Variety critic Lisa Nesselson July 26, 2000 wrote "A fantastical romp with a buoyant pace, exotic locations, a finger-popping score, appealing leads and spicy cooking demonstrations." "A contempo fairy tale about thwarted romance, the pic never falters in its adherence to its own bubbly, consistently inventive rhythm."

In 2010, Torres won the best feature film prize at the Los Angeles Latino International Film Festival with her film Habana Eva. The film also won the Best Venezuelan Film prize at the Margarita Film Festival in Venezuela. Nelmes, Jill, and Jule Selbo. Women Screenwriters: An International Guide. Print.</ref>

In 2011, she co-wrote the romantic comedy From Prada to Nada, based on Sense and Sensibility by Jane Austen. In 2014, she directed Liz in September, an adaptation of the American play Last Summer at Bluefish Cove.

She is a member of the Writers Guild of America and the Société des Auteurs et Compositeurs Dramatiques (SACD) of France.

Social Advocacy 
In 1995 Torres was identified as part of a new movement in Latin American cinema focusing less on films with political themes as had been the norm, and more on universal themes like relationships and conflicts between traditional culture and modernity. Torres' films in particular, focus on strong female characters who defy patriarchal norms.

In an interview with GLAAD in 2015, she expressed a desire to help young gay and lesbian people through her film Liz in September. The film was an adaptation of Last Summer at Bluefish Cove, a play known as part of the first wave of American gay theater and centers on LGBT themes. The film has a focus on lesbian characters and issues and stars Venezuelan actress and model Patricia Velásquez, who identifies as lesbian.

Awards 
For the film Oriana: 
May 1985: Caméra d'Or (Golden Camera) during the Cannes Festival, sélection officielle "Un certain regard"
1985: Bronze Hugo, Chicago International film Festival
1985: Catalina de Oro (Golden Catalina) for best film, Cartagena International film Festival
1985: Catalina de Oro (Golden Catalina) for best script, Cartagena International film Festival
Glauber Rocha's award for Best Spanish language film, Figueira da Foz International Film Festival
August 1985: Revista Mujeres' award during the Figueira da Foz International Film Festival
Honour Mencion of the Catholic Office-Figueira da Foz International Film Festival
1985: Honour Mencion of the Jury and henour mention of the Catholic Office, MANHEIM Film Festival
1986: National Awards (premios municipales de Caracas) for best film, best director, best photography, best actress
Ateneo de Caracas award
For the film Celestial Clockwork: 
1995: Prix du public during the Namur Film Festival
1996: Grand Jury Award for outstanding narrative feature, Outfest Los Angeles Festival
1996: Anac National Award for best Venezualian film
1996: Special award during the Washington Film Festival
For the film Women On Top: 
2000: Sélection officielle "Un Certain Regard" during the Cannes Film Festival
2001: Nominated for best director during the Alma Awards
For the film Habana Eva: 
2010: Best film during the New York International Latino Film Fest
2010: 2nd audience award during the Los Angeles International Latino Film Fest
2010: Best film audience award during the Amazonia International Film Fest (Brazil)
2010: Best film during the International Latino Margarita Film Fest
2010: Best supporting actress during the Merida International Film Fest
2010: Best actress during the Cines Unidos Award
2011: Mesquite award for best film San Antonio Film Fest
Best actress during the Prakriti Maduro Punta Del Este Film Fest (Uruguay)
For the film Liz in September:
Audience Award for best women's feature at Atlanta's Out On Film LGBT Film Festival
Audience Award for best feature at the SouthWest Gay and Lesbian Film Festival
2015: Best feature during Atlanta's Out On Film
2015: Best women's feature Festival Les Gais Cine Mad (España) 
2015: Audience Award 2015 during the Festival Sant Andreu de la Barca 
2015: Best Foreign Film during the Out Film CT: Connecticut Gay & Lesbian Film Festival 
Best Feature Audience Award during the Miami Gay & Lesbian Film Festival

Filmography
 Oriana (1985)
 Celestial Clockwork  (1996)
 Woman on Top (2000)
 Habana Eva (2008)
 Liz in September (2014)

See also
 List of female film and television directors
 List of LGBT-related films directed by women

References

External links

 Interview for the Newspaper El Universal (Spanish)

1951 births
Living people
People from Caracas
Venezuelan women film directors
Venezuelan film producers
Venezuelan screenwriters
Venezuelan women screenwriters
Venezuelan film directors
Directors of Caméra d'Or winners
Venezuelan women film producers